Small rattlesnake may refer to:

 Crotalus horridus, a.k.a. the timber rattlesnake, a venomous pitviper species found in the eastern United States.
 Sistrurus miliarius, a.k.a. the pigmy rattlesnake, a venomous pitviper species found in the southeastern United States.